Milkeh-ye Baqer (also Romanized as Mīlkeh-ye Bāqer; also known as Mīlgeh-e Bāqar and Millehgāh) is a village in Haft Ashiyan Rural District, Kuzaran District, Kermanshah County, Kermanshah Province, Iran. At the 2006 census, its population was 44, in 8 families.

References 

Populated places in Kermanshah County